1939 Emperor's Cup Final was the 19th final of the Emperor's Cup competition. The final was played at Meiji Jingu Gaien Stadium in Tokyo on June 11, 1939. Keio BRB won the championship.

Overview
Keio BRB won the championship, by defeating defending champion Waseda University 3–2.

Match details

See also
1939 Emperor's Cup

References

Emperor's Cup
1939 in Japanese football